Eriogonum congdonii is a species of wild buckwheat known by the common name Congdon's buckwheat. It is endemic to the Klamath Mountains of northern California, where it is an uncommon member of the serpentine soils flora in the local forests. It is a low, matting shrub growing up to about half a meter wide and tall. The woolly leaves are widely lance-shaped and are found along the stems, especially in clusters at the stem tips. The inflorescence is an erect, dense umbel of many tiny bright yellow flowers.

External links
Jepson Manual Treatment
Photo gallery

congdonii
Flora of California
Flora without expected TNC conservation status